Wacky Blackout is a 1942 Warner Bros. Looney Tunes cartoon directed by Bob Clampett. The short was released on July 11, 1942.

Plot
As with a number of early-1940s Looney Tunes shorts, the plot consists of a loosely tied collection of cutaway gags; in this case, the common theme is life on the home front during World War II.

The cartoon opens up on a farm, and a narrator (voiced by Mel Blanc) describes how farmers are prepared for any emergency during the war. We see a farmer trying to put out a fire, and the narrator says that the farmer has trained his dog to put out fires. The narrator says that the dog is a "full-blooded spitz", as the dog puts out the fires by spitting.
The narrator then says that a cow has increased her production and she has given 5000 quarts of milk a day. The cow (voiced by Sara Berner) then says that they come in and take it from her, and cries. Meanwhile, a baby cow says, "What a performance.".
A turkey is eating food, and the narrator says that when the turkey reaches 20 pounds, they put him in the oven. Upon hearing this, the turkey goes to an exercising machine, reading a book on how to lose weight in 18 days.
As turtle eggs get ready to hatch, the narrator says that the turtles are born with a natural bombshell shelter on their backs. Two turtle eggs hatch, and the final one pops out of the shell, zooming around. The turtle stops, and says that he's a jeep, and continues zooming around, laughing in a fashion similar to the Road Runner's beeping.
Back on the farm, a dog tries to ask his lover, Marie-Alana, something. The dog wishes there was a blackout. He sees a lightswitch, and yells "BLACKOUT!". After a short blackout, the dog has lipstick stains on his face, and he turns off the lights again, yelling "BLACKOUT!".
Glum caterpillars appear, as the narrator has no idea why they are glum. Just then, a happy caterpillar comes crawling on-screen. The caterpillar says that he's happy because he just got a retread. He laughs, and rolls off.
The narrator says that fireflies are going to stage a practice blackout. The fireflies then turn off their lights. Meanwhile, the narrator tells a turtle to go into his shell because it's a blackout, but the turtle doesn't want to. The turtle then climbs into his shell, and the narrator asks him why he didn't want to go into his shell. The turtle then says that he's afraid of the dark. The narrator tells the fireflies that the blackout is over, and all the fireflies turn their lights back on... except for one. The firefly notices and asks the others who stole his bulb, and the one behind him gives his bulb back.
A mother bird is teaching her son how to fly. After she shows him an example, the bird says that he wants to be a dive bomber. The bird flies around, mimicking a plane engine, and the mother bird shrugs to the audience.
The narrator says that the only living things to not be affected by the war are the famous swallows of Capistrano. The narrator also says that the birds return to a mission on a certain day each year. He also says that they are just in time for their return. Just then, a delivery person comes and says that there is a telegram for the audience. The message says (sung by the messenger to the tune of “My Bonnie Lies Over the Ocean”): "We are out over the ocean. We can't even get close to land. We can't fly to Capistrano, past the Fourth Interceptor Command.  Signed, the Swallows".
Elderly carrier pigeons are in their home. The narrator says that they give their sons to the service during each war. Pa says, "Well, Ma...", then the two pigeons start singing "We did it before and we can do it again". Then, they watch their sons fly in the sky, heading out to war.
A running gag in this cartoon is a woodpecker (voiced by Kent Rogers, doing a Red Skelton voice) pecking a cat named Old Tom's tail. In gag 5, he says that he pecked the cat's tail again. Near the end of the cartoon, Old Tom says that he ate the woodpecker, and the woodpecker pecks through his stomach.

See also
 Looney Tunes and Merrie Melodies filmography (1940-49)
 List of animated films in the public domain in the United States

References

External links
 

1942 animated films
1942 films
Looney Tunes shorts
Films directed by Bob Clampett
American black-and-white films
American World War II propaganda shorts
1940s American animated films
Films scored by Carl Stalling
1940s English-language films